Fatal Frame II: Crimson Butterfly, is a Japanese survival horror video game developed and published by Tecmo in 2003 for the PlayStation 2. It is the second installment in the Fatal Frame series, and features an independent story with little relation to the first title. The story follows twin sisters Mio and Mayu Amakura as they explore an abandoned village and experience encounters with the paranormal. Their lives quickly become threatened when the village spirits begin to possess Mayu and target them as sacrifices for an ancient ritual. Players must use a camera with powers of exorcism to defeat enemies and uncover the secrets of the village.

Development of Fatal Frame II began shortly after the completion of the first title. Because many players were too frightened to finish the original, Tecmo made the sequel's story more interesting to encourage players to see it through and finish the game. Despite this, horror was still the central focus of the game. Director Makoto Shibata kept the perpetual nature of spirits in mind during development. Ghosts reappearing in different locations, and being able to feel their presence even after their death were characteristics Shibata felt were indicative of a horror scenario.

Upon release, Fatal Frame II received positive reviews, and is widely considered to be among the scariest video games ever made. An Xbox port, subtitled Director's Cut, was released in 2004 and included improved visuals, audio, and new gameplay modes. The game has also been re-released on the PlayStation 3 via PSN in 2013, and a remake of the game titled Project Zero 2: Wii Edition was released for the Wii in 2012 in Europe and Japan.

Gameplay

Fatal Frame II is a survival horror video game. For most of the game, the player controls the protagonist Mio Amakura as she and her sister Mayu explore a ghost town. As they explore the town and uncover its secrets, they defeat enemies in the form of ghosts and spirits by taking pictures of them with an enchanted camera, the Camera Obscura. There are two modes of gameplay, field mode and viewfinder mode. When in field mode, the player controls Mio directly and can examine items and search areas for clues. When the camera is used, the game enters viewfinder mode, from where pictures of ghosts and scenery can be taken. Information about the camera film type, lens type, and camera enhancements is visible.

Most of the game is spent directing Mio followed closely by Mayu as they explore the village.  A filament in the corner of the screen will glow when ghosts or clues are nearby. Many clues are only visible through the viewfinder, and some ghosts are non-hostile and will provide hints to advance further. Sometimes Mayu will stop if she finds a clue as well. Other than clues and key items to progress the narrative, consumable items such as health restoratives and film for the Camera Obscura can be found.

Fighting spirits by taking pictures of them is a key gameplay mechanic. When in viewfinder mode, one can take pictures of enemies, damaging them. More damage can be dealt by snapping shots at certain moments, indicated by the filaments and lights on the camera. Power-up lenses can be used to provide added affects such as slowing down the enemy or pushing them back. Pictures taken with the camera can be saved to the memory card. Mayu cannot fight off ghosts, and if she takes too much damage, it results in a game over. The player character Mio has a health meter, and like Mayu, if she receives too much damage it is game over. The game must then be continued from a previous save. The game can only be saved at red lanterns located in throughout the village.

Plot

Setting and characters

Fatal Frame II is set in the fictional  region of Japan. The region is home to Minakami Village (lit. "All God's Village"), an abandoned town where the majority of the game takes place. The player learns that Minakami Village was host to the "Crimson Sacrifice Ritual", the failure of which caused the settlement to vanish—thus earning it the name "The Lost Village". In the game's present, 1988, two years after the first game canonically, there is an urban legend about the Lost Village, where people who become lost in the Minakami forest will become trapped forever in the village.

The protagonists of Fatal Frame II are Mio and Mayu Amakura, twin sisters who are visiting their favorite childhood playspot in Minakami before it is lost due to construction of a new dam. The main antagonist is the vengeful spirit of Sae Kurosawa, the sole Twin Shrine Maiden sacrificed for the failed ritual. She yearns to reunite with her twin sister Yae. Sae mistakes Mio for her sister, and wants to use Mayu to try and complete the ritual with her. Other characters include the spirit of Itsuki Tachibana, a young man who also mistakes Mio for Yae, but instead tries to help her and Mayu escape; and Seijiro Makabe, a folklorist who visited Minakami Village with a Camera Obscura prototype (the same camera Mio uses in the game) and his assistant, Ryozo Munakata.

Story
The plot of Fatal Frame II is independent from the first game in the series. During the Amakura twins' visit to their favorite childhood playspot in the Minakami region, Mayu follows a mysterious red butterfly deep into the woods. Mio, concerned for her older sister, follows, and they soon discover a village at night. While it seems abandoned, the twins soon realize that the village contains the tortured souls of the dead, forever reliving the events that trapped them in this state.

Mayu soon falls under the village's spell and is led deeper into the village by the butterflies. As Mio searches for her, she slowly learns of the Crimson Sacrifice Ritual, the failure of which caused the "Repentance", a disaster which shrouded the village in darkness. The village houses a system of tunnels underneath, where its deepest point is home to the "Hellish Abyss", a deep hole that collects the souls of the dead. To keep the Abyss from unleashing the dead, a pair of twins born in the village are required to perform a ritual approximately every decade, in which the elder twin strangles the younger, after which the soul of the younger twin stays to guard the village as a crimson butterfly while the older stays in the living world as the remaining.

In the past, before the Repentance occurred, twins Yae and Sae Kurosawa tried to escape their fate with Itsuki's help. While fleeing, Sae was caught and brought back to the village, while Yae escaped. The Minakami villagers desperately hanged Sae to try to satisfy the Hellish Abyss; however, the attempt failed since Yae's body wasn't there for Sae's soul to reunite with, causing the Repentance to occur and the village to disappear. During the Repentance, Sae returned from the Hellish Abyss as a vengeful spirit along with folklorist Seijiro Makabe, who had previously been made a Kusabi (an outsider sacrificed to satisfy the Hellish Abyss if it rumbled during a year when a twin sacrifice wasn't ready), and together they slaughtered the rest of the priests and villagers who were still living. The village now only exists in a state of perpetual death, populated by the deceased villagers who are reliving the night of sacrificial failure. Throughout the game, several ghosts refer to Mio as Yae and seem to expect her to perform the ritual with Mayu, who slowly becomes possessed by Sae as the game continues. Itsuki, however, tries to help her—believing the two to be the Kurosawa twins, he tries to aid their escape from the village again.

Near the end of the game, Mio learns that in Minakami Village, the twin born second is considered the elder, as the village believes that the "elder" lets the weaker, "younger" twin be born first. This completely reverses Mio's implied fate: instead of being sacrificed herself, she must now strangle her "younger" twin sister. When Mio and Mayu finally begin escaping, the villagers' spirits take Mayu back to the Kurosawa house, where the Hellish Abyss awaits them below. Should the player choose to take the escape route alone, they will obtain the Lingering Scent ending, which leads to a game over. If the player instead chooses to pursue Mayu, they have a chance to obtain the other endings. The "Crimson Butterfly" ending sees Mio and Mayu proceeding with the ritual, where Mayu becomes a crimson butterfly, After that, Mio is shown running after her sister's butterfly, crying her name and telling her how sorry she is for killing her. She reaches out to catch the butterfly, but it flies away just out of her grasp, causing Mio to fall to her knees in tears as the flock of butterflies part the dark skies and the sun rises over the village. After the credits, it shows Mio sitting alone on a bench near the lake that replaced the village because of All God's Dam. It shows her to have a crimson butterfly mark on her neck as well. After that, the screen goes black and it's heard Mio's voice saying, "Didn't we always promise each other? Together...forever...". The "Hellish Abyss" ending sees Mio rescuing Mayu from Sae, only to become permanently blinded from looking into the Hellish Abyss. The "Promise Ending", added to the Director's Cut version, Mio sees Yae and Sae performing the ritual and freeing the villagers' spirits, thus sparing Mio and Mayu of the ritual. According to the events of Fatal Frame III: The Tormented, the direct sequel of the game, the "Crimson Butterfly" ending is the canonical ending.

Development
Development of a sequel to the original Fatal Frame began "relatively soon" after its release. Many players were too scared to finish the first game, so for the sequel, Tecmo shifted their attention to create a more interesting storyline to encourage players to see it through. Despite this, Fatal Frame II was developed with "horror" being the central focus more-so than the "action". Producer Keisuke Kikuchi and director of the Xbox port, Zin Hasegawa, called it "horror that appeals to human imagination", citing how some people get scared when hearing faint sounds in the dark. Kikuchi cited symmetry as a central theme in the story, in that, "tragedies and fear are based on what happens when you tear things apart", such as butterflies and twins.

In creating the horror atmosphere, they considered more closely how spirits may behave. They may randomly disappear or reappear in different locations, and their presence can sometimes still be felt after they are killed. Shibata called these "never-endings loops" characteristic of a horror scenario, and this illusion was something he felt in a dream which he was using as inspiration for the game's story. Kikuchi took his inspiration from movies, literature, and also traditions and customs. He specifically cited Japanese novelist Seishi Yokomizo and Stanley Kubrick's The Shining as inspirations.

The decision to make an Xbox port of Fatal Frame II was not made until after release of the PlayStation 2 version and during planning of Fatal Frame III. The Xbox port featured enhanced graphics with better lighting techniques, and also a Dolby Digital audio option was added. Additional gameplay modes were also added, First-Person Shooter Mode and Survival Mode, and more costumes as well. Kikuchi considers this version to be "Fatal Frame 2.5".

Release
Fatal Frame II was originally released in 2003 for the PlayStation 2. This version has been made available for download on the PlayStation 3. The PS3 version was removed from the online store shortly after release due to various technical issues with the emulator, before it was fixed and re-released on July 30, 2013. The download was only available for players in North America.

Fatal Frame II: Crimson Butterfly Director's Cut was released for the Xbox in 2004. The director's cut added in several updates, including a first-person play mode, a survival mode, a new ending, enhanced graphics, and a greater number of alternate costumes to unlock. In first-person mode, the player can play through the entire game from a first-person perspective. The Xbox version also has a "shop" feature where the player can trade points from pictures for healing items and film.

A remake of the game, titled Project Zero 2: Wii Edition, was released for the Wii in 2012, exclusively in Japan and Europe.

Reception

Fatal Frame II: Crimson Butterfly has received positive reviews from critics. Aggregating review website Metacritic gave the Xbox version 84/100, and the PS2 version 81/100.

Fatal Frame II was ranked second in GameTrailers' "Top Ten Scariest Games" in 2006, and third in X-Play's "Top Ten Scariest Games of All Time". Game Informer also ranked it number one on a similar list. Ars Technica published an article about the game in its 2011 Halloween Masterpieces series, while PSU.com in 2003 opined Fatal Frame II was the scariest video game ever made. Fatal Frame II was a nominee for GameSpot's 2004 "Best Adventure Game" award, which ultimately went to Myst IV: Revelation.

Naughty Dog's Neil Druckmann described the game as "the scariest kind of experience in any medium; I haven't seen a movie that comes close".

Notes

References

External links

  (PS2)  
  (Xbox) 

2003 video games
2000s horror video games
Dolls in fiction
Fatal Frame games
Mass murder in fiction
Video games about curses
Video games about witchcraft
Video games featuring female protagonists
Microsoft games
PlayStation 2 games
PlayStation Network games
Psychological horror games
Tecmo games
Twins in fiction
Ubisoft games
Video games about insects
Video games developed in Japan
Video games set in Japan
Video games set in 1988
Xbox games
Single-player video games

de:Project Zero#Project Zero II: Crimson Butterfly
ja:零 (ゲーム)#零 紅い蝶